John Birmelin (October 31, 1873 – September 3, 1950) has been called the Poet Laureate of the Pennsylvania Dutch and is one of the most popular poets and playwrights in the Pennsylvania German language.

Early life
Birmelin was born in Longswamp Township, Pennsylvania to a Pennsylvania German mother and a German father, who was a native of Baden, Germany.  He studied music at a young age. By the age of eleven, he was an organist in the local church where his father was a member of the choir.

Career
In 1896, he moved to Allentown, Pennsylvania. In 1901, he accepted a job as the organist and choirmaster of Allentown's Sacred Heart of Jesus Church, a position he held until his retirement only weeks before his death in 1950. His successor as organist and choirmaster at Sacred Heart was Karl Buesgen, Birmelin's student and noted Pennsylvania impressionist landscape painter. Birmelin was also the first music teacher at Allentown Central Catholic High School, a position he held from 1926 to 1936.

Literary
Although he wrote some poetry and verse as a young child, Birmelin did not begin writing again until the later years of his life.  During the early 1930s, Birmelin's poetry was included as part of "'S Pennsylvaanisch Deitsch Eck" ("The Pennsylvania Dutch Corner") column in The Morning Call, and writings from Birmelin were in 62 of the first 100 published columns.  His most commercially successful work was Mammi Gans: The Dialect Nursery Rhymes of John Birmelin, a Pennsylvania German translation of many of the Mother Goose nursery rhymes.  Birmelin's poetry often dealt with aspects of Pennsylvania German life and history.  "Gwendeltee", one of his earliest works, is a poem about a beautiful Pennsylvania German girl on a farm.  "Regina Hartmann" tells about the return of a Pennsylvania German girl taken prisoner during the French and Indian War.  "Der Laaf Kaaf" pertains to the Walking Purchase.

Birmelin's Pennsylvania German translation of the song "America (My Country, 'Tis of Thee)" (often known as "America") was, and still remains, regularly sung at Fersommling and other Pennsylvania German events:

Legacy
According to Homer Tope Rosenberger, Birmelin "had the power to write compelling poetry in the dialect that makes one sad, or joyous, pensive, or reminiscent" and that Birmelin's poetry had "a special quality because he weighed carefully the sound of dialect words.  Birmelin's poetry dealt with Pennsylvania German issues and life, "sometimes humorously and other times in serious vein" and he "wrote in the dialect with dignity, but with a warmth that went to the heart."

Bibliography

Plays
Der Gnopp
M Dr. Fogel sei Office Schtunn

Poems
"'S Alder un der Dot"
"Buchschtaaweschpielerei"
"Celia von Berneville"
"Gwendeltee"
"Gezwitscher"
"Der Laaf Kaaf"
"Regina Hartmann"

Translations
Mammi Gans: The Dialect Nursery Rhymes of John Birmelin (a collection of Mother Goose rhymes translated into Pennsylvania German)
"My Country, 'Tis of Thee" (often known as "America") (translated into Pennsylvania German)
Robert Louis Stevenson's A Child's Garden of Verses (translated into Pennsylvania German)

Collections and anthologies
Poems in "'S Pennsylvaanisch Deitsch Eck" ("The Pennsylvania Dutch Corner") column in The Morning Call
Gezwitscher (collection of poems, published in 1938 as part of the yearbook of the Pennsylvania German Folklore Society)
Later Poems of John Birmelin (published 1951)

Resources

Barba, Preston A. Introduction to Gezwitscher. The Pennsylvania German Society, III.  Allentown, Pennsylvania, 1938.
Buffington, Albert F. (ed).  The Reichard Collection of Early Pennsylvania German Plays. Lancaster, Pennsylvania: Pennsylvania German Society, 1962.  Pages 398–439.
Haag, Earl C.  A Pennsylvania German Anthology. Selinsgrove, Pennsylvania: Susquehanna University Press, 1988.
Rosenberger, Homer Tope. The Pennsylvania Germans, 1891-1965. Lancaster, Pennsylvania: Pennsylvania German Society, 1966. Pages 215–217.

1873 births
1950 deaths
Poets from Pennsylvania
German-American history
Pennsylvania Dutch people
Writers from Allentown, Pennsylvania